Correios de Moçambique is the company responsible for postal service in Mozambique. It is headquartered in the colonial-period Maputo Post Office Building on 25 de Setembro Avenue.

External links

Communications in Mozambique
Companies based in Maputo
Mozambique